Mumtaz née Maqsood Ahmed Kazi also popularly known as Mumtaz M. Kazi is an Indian train engineer who is also regarded as the first Indian woman to drive a diesel engine train. In fact, she is also Asia's first woman locomotive driver after  Surekha Yadav  (https://en.m.wikipedia.org/wiki/Surekha_Yadav) . She was awarded the prestigious Nari Shakti Puraskar in March 2017 coinciding the International Women's Day from the then Indian President Pranab Mukherjee.

Early life 
Kazi was born and raised up in Mumbai, the commercial capital of the Maharashtra state and hails from an orthodox Muslim family. She graduated from the Seth Anandilal Rodar High School in Santacruz in 1989. Her father Allarakhu Ismail Kathwala served as an employee in the Indian Railways. Mumtaz followed the footsteps of her father and pursued her career as a full time train driver. However she was initially not allowed by her father to take up the job in the Railways department. He told her to complete the course in Medical Laboratory Technology but Mumtaz later convinced him regarding the decision.

Career 
After her graduation in 1989, in the same year she applied for the post of engine driver. She started driving train at the age of 20 in 1991 and was recognised by the Limca Book of Records as the first Asian female locomotive driver in 1995.

She was promoted from ALP-diesel to second motorwoman in 2005. Since then she pilots the local trains through India's first and most congested railway route, the Chhatrapati Shivaji Maharaj Terminus - Thane section till 2023.

She received Nari Shakti Puraskar award, an award which is given in India annually recognizing the achievements of women. She also received Railway General Manager Award in 2015 from the Indian Railways.

Personal life 
She married electrical engineer Maqsood Kazi.

References 

People from Mumbai
21st-century Indian women
21st-century Indian people
Year of birth missing (living people)
Living people
Train drivers